The Yeniseian languages (sometimes known as Yeniseic or Yenisei-Ostyak; occasionally spelled with -ss-) are a family of languages that are spoken by the Yeniseian people in the Yenisei River region of central Siberia. As part of the proposed Dené–Yeniseian language family, the Yeniseian languages have been argued to be part of "the first demonstration of a genealogical link between Old World and New World language families that meets the standards of traditional comparative-historical linguistics". The only surviving language of the group today is Ket.

From hydronymic and genetic data, it is suggested that the Yeniseian languages were spoken in a much greater area in ancient times, including parts of northern China and Mongolia. It has been further proposed that the recorded distribution of Yeniseian languages from the 17th century onward represents a relatively recent northward migration, and that the Yeniseian urheimat lies to the south of Lake Baikal.

The Yeniseians have been connected to the Xiongnu, whose ruling elite may have spoken a southern Yeniseian language similar to Pumpokol. The Jie, who ruled the Later Zhao state of northern China, are likewise believed to have spoken a Pumpokolic language based on linguistic and ethnogeographic data.

For those who argue the Xiongnu spoke a Yeniseian language, the Yeniseian languages are thought to have contributed many ubiquitous loanwords to Turkic and Mongolic vocabulary, such as Khan, Khagan, Tarqan, and the word for "god" and "sky", Tengri. This conclusion has primarily been drawn from the analysis of preserved Xiongnu texts in the form of Chinese characters.

Classification

Proto-Yeniseian (before 500 BC; split around 1 AD)
 Northern Yeniseian (split around 700 AD)
 Ket (550 speakers)
 Yugh 
 Southern Yeniseian 
 Kott–Assan (split around 1200 AD)
 Kott  (extinct by the mid-1800s)
 Assan  (extinct by 1800)
 Arin–Pumpokol (split around 550 AD)
 Arin  (extinct by 1800)
 Pumpokol  (extinct by 1750)
 ? Jie 

It is theorized that the Xiongnu and Hunnic languages were Southern Yeniseian. Only two languages of this family survived into the 20th century: Ket (also known as Imbat Ket), with around 200 speakers, and Yugh (also known as Sym Ket), now extinct. The other known members of this family—Arin, Assan, Pumpokol, and Kott—have been extinct for over two centuries. Other groups—the Buklin, Baikot, Yarin, Yastin, Ashkyshtym, and Koibalkyshtym—are identifiable as Yeniseic speaking from tsarist fur-tax records compiled during the 17th century, but nothing remains of their languages except a few proper names.

Distribution 
Ket, the only extant Yeniseian language, is the northernmost known. Historical sources record a contemporaneous northern expansion of the Ket along the Yenisei during the Russian conquest of Siberia. Today, it is mainly spoken in Turukhansky District of Krasnoyarsk Krai in far northern Siberia, in villages such as Kellog and Sulomay. Yugh, which only recently faced extinction, was spoken from Yeniseysk to Vorogovo, Yartsevo, and the upper Ket River.

The early modern distributions of Arin, Pumpokol, Kott, and Assan can be reconstructed. The Arin were north of Krasnoyarsk, whereas the closely related Pumpokol was spoken to the north and west of it, along the upper Ket. Kott and Assan, another pair of closely related languages, occupied the area south of Krasnoyarsk, and east to the Kan River. From toponyms it can be seen that Yeniseian populations probably lived in Buryatia, Zabaykalsky, and northern Mongolia. As an example, the toponym ši can be found in Zabaykalsky Krai, which is probably related to the Proto-Yeniseian word sēs "river" and likely derives from an undocumented Yeniseian language. Some toponyms that appear Yeniseian extend as far as Heilongjiang.

Václav Blažek argues, based on hydronymic data, that Yeniseians were once spread out even farther into the west. He compares, for example, the word šet, found in more westerly river names, to Proto-Yeniseian sēs "river."

Origins and history 

According to a 2016 study, Yeniseian people and their language originated likely somewhere near the Altai Mountains or near Lake Baikal. According to this study, the Yeniseians are linked to Paleo-Eskimo groups. The Yeniseians have also been hypothesised to be representative of a back-migration from Beringia to central Siberia, and the Dené–Yeniseians a result of a radiation of populations out of the Bering land bridge.

In Siberia, Edward Vajda observed that Yeniseian hydronyms in the circumpolar region (the recent area of distribution of Yeniseian languages) clearly overlay earlier systems, with the layering of morphemes onto Ugric, Samoyedic, Turkic, and Tungusic place names. It is therefore proposed that the homeland, or dispersal point, of the Yeniseian languages lies in the boreal region between Lake Baikal, northern Mongolia, and the Upper Yenisei basin, referred to by Vajda as a territory "abandoned" by the original Yeniseian speakers. On the other hand, Václav Blažek (2019) argues that based on hydronomic evidence, Yeneisian languages were originally spoken on the northern slopes of the Tianshan and Pamir mountains before dispersing downstream via the Irtysh River.

The modern populations of Yeniseians in central and northern Siberia are thus not indigenous, and represents a more recent migration northward. This was noted by Russian explorers during the conquest of Siberia: the Ket are recorded to have been expanding northwards along the Yenisei, from the river Yeloguy to the Kureyka, from the 17th century onward. Based on these records, the modern Ket-speaking area appears to represent the very northernmost reaches of Yeniseian migration. 

The origin of this northward migration from the Mongolian steppe has been connected to the fall of the Xiongnu confederation. It appears from Chinese sources that a Yeniseian group might have been a major part of the heterogeneous Xiongnu tribal confederation, who have traditionally been considered the ancestors of the Huns and other Northern Asian groups. However, these suggestions are difficult to substantiate due to the paucity of data.

Alexander Vovin argues that at least parts of the Xiongnu, possibly its core or ruling class, spoke a Yeniseian language. Positing a higher degree of similarity of Xiongnu to Yeniseian as compared to Turkic, he also praised Stefan Georg's demonstration of how the word Tengri (the Turkic and Mongolic word for "sky" and later "god") originated from Proto-Yeniseian tɨŋVr.

It has been further suggested that the Yeniseian-speaking Xiongnu elite underwent a language shift to Oghur Turkic while migrating westward, eventually becoming the Huns. However, it has also been suggested that the core of the Hunnic language was a Yeniseian language.

Vajda (et al. 2013) proposed that the ruling elite of the Huns spoke a Yeniseian language and influenced other languages in the region.

One sentence of the language of the Jie, a Xiongnu tribe who founded the Later Zhao state, appears consistent with being a Yeniseian language. Later study suggests that Jie is closer to Pumpokol than to other Yeniseian languages such as Ket. This has been substantiated with geographical data by Vajda, who states that Yeniseian hydronyms found in northern Mongolia are exclusively Pumpokolic, in the process demonstrating both a linguistic and geographic proximity between Yeniseian and Jie.

The decline of the southern Yeniseian languages during and after the Russian conquest of Siberia has been attributed to language shifts of the Arin and Pumpokol to Khakas or Chulym Tatar, and the Kott and Assan to Khakas.

Family features
The Yeniseian languages share many contact-induced similarities with the South Siberian Turkic languages, Samoyedic languages, and Evenki. These include long-distance nasal harmony, the development of former affricates to stops, and the use of postpositions or grammatical enclitics as clausal subordinators. Yeniseic nominal enclitics closely approximate the case systems of geographically contiguous families. Despite these similarities, Yeniseian appears to stand out among the languages of Siberia in several typological respects, such as the presence of tone, the prefixing verb inflection, and highly complex morphophonology.

The Yeniseian languages have been described as having up to four tones or no tones at all. The 'tones' are concomitant with glottalization, vowel length, and breathy voice, not unlike the situation reconstructed for Old Chinese before the development of true tones in Chinese. The Yeniseian languages have highly elaborate verbal morphology.

The following table exemplifies the basic Yeniseian numerals as well as the various attempts at reconstructing the proto-forms:

The following table exemplifies a few basic vocabulary items as well as the various attempts at reconstructing the proto-forms:

Proposed relations to other language families
Until 2008, few linguists had accepted connections between Yeniseian and any other language family, though distant connections have been proposed with most of the ergative languages of Eurasia.

Dené–Yeniseian

In 2008, Edward Vajda of Western Washington University presented evidence for a genealogical relation between the Yeneisian languages of Siberia and the Na–Dené languages of North America. At the time of publication (2010), Vajda's proposals had been favorably reviewed by several specialists of Na-Dené and Yeniseian languages—although at times with caution—including Michael Krauss, Jeff Leer, James Kari, and Heinrich Werner, as well as a number of other respected linguists, such as Bernard Comrie, Johanna Nichols, Victor Golla, Michael Fortescue, Eric Hamp, and Bill Poser (Kari and Potter 2010:12). One significant exception is the critical review of the volume of collected papers by Lyle Campbell and a response by Vajda published in late 2011 that clearly indicate the proposal is not completely settled at the present time. Two other reviews and notices of the volume appeared in 2011 by Keren Rice and Jared Diamond.

Karasuk

The Karasuk hypothesis, linking Yeniseian to Burushaski, has been proposed by several scholars, notably by A.P. Dulson and V.N. Toporov. George van Driem, the most prominent current advocate of the Karasuk hypothesis, postulates that the Burusho people were part of the migration out of Central Asia, that resulted in the Indo-European conquest of the Indus Valley.

Sino-Tibetan

As noted by Tailleur and Werner, some of the earliest proposals of genetic relations of Yeniseian, by M.A. Castrén (1856), James Byrne (1892), and G.J. Ramstedt (1907), suggested that Yeniseian was a northern relative of the Sino–Tibetan languages. These ideas were followed much later by Kai Donner and Karl Bouda. A 2008 study found further evidence for a possible relation between Yeniseian and Sino–Tibetan, citing several possible cognates. Gao Jingyi (2014) identified twelve Sinitic and Yeniseian shared etymologies that belonged to the basic vocabulary, and argued that these Sino-Yeniseian etymologies could not be loans from either language into the other. A link between the Na–Dené languages and Sino–Tibetan languages, known as Sino–Dené had also been proposed by Edward Sapir. Around 1920 Sapir became convinced that Na–Dené was more closely related to Sino–Tibetan than to other American families. Edward Vadja's Dené–Yeniseian proposal renewed interest among linguists such as Geoffrey Caveney (2014) to look into support for the Sino–Dené hypothesis. Caveney considered a link between Sino–Tibetan, Na–Dené, and Yeniseian to be plausible but did not support the hypothesis that Sino–Tibetan and Na–Dené were related to the Caucasian languages (Sino–Caucasian and Dené–Caucasian).

Dené–Caucasian

Bouda, in various publications in the 1930s through the 1950s, described a linguistic network that (besides Yeniseian and Sino-Tibetan) also included Caucasian, and Burushaski, some forms of which have gone by the name of Sino-Caucasian. The works of R. Bleichsteiner and O.G. Tailleur, the late Sergei A. Starostin and Sergei L. Nikolayev have sought to confirm these connections. Others who have developed the hypothesis, often expanded to Dené–Caucasian, include J.D. Bengtson, V. Blažek, J.H. Greenberg (with M. Ruhlen), and M. Ruhlen. George Starostin continues his father's work in Yeniseian, Sino-Caucasian and other fields. 
This theory is very controversial or viewed as obsolete by nearly all modern linguists.

Notes

References

Bibliography

 Anderson, G. (2003) 'Yeniseic languages in Siberian areal perspective', Sprachtypologie und Universalienforschung 56.1/2: 12–39. Berlin: Akademie Verlag.
 Anonymous. (1925). The Similarity of Chinese and Indian Languages. Science Supplement 62 (1607): xii. [Usually incorrectly cited as "Sapir (1925)": see Kaye (1992), Bengtson (1994).]
 Bengtson, John D. (1994). Edward Sapir and the 'Sino-Dené' Hypothesis. Anthropological Science 102.3: 207–230.
 Bengtson, John D. (1998). Caucasian and Sino-Tibetan: A Hypothesis of S. A. Starostin. General Linguistics, Vol. 36, no. 1/2, 1998 (1996). Pegasus Press, University of North Carolina, Asheville, North Carolina.
 Bengtson, John D. (1998). Some Yenisseian Isoglosses. Mother tongue IV, 1998.
 Bengtson, J.D. (2008). Materials for a Comparative Grammar of the Dene–Caucasian (Sino-Caucasian) Languages. In Aspects of Comparative Linguistics, v. 3., pp. 45–118. Moscow: RSUH Publishers.
 Blažaek, Václav, and John D. Bengtson. 1995. "Lexica Dene–Caucasica." Central Asiatic Journal 39.1: 11–50, 39.2: 161–164.
 Bleichsteiner, Robert. (1930). "Die werschikisch-burischkische Sprache im Pamirgebiet und ihre Stellung zu den Japhetitensprachen des Kaukasus [The Werchikwar-Burushaski language in the Pamir region and its position relative to the Japhetic languages of the Caucasus]." Wiener Beiträge zur Kunde des Morgenlandes 1: 289–331.
 Bouda, Karl. (1936). Jenisseisch-tibetische Wortgleichungen [Yeniseian-Tibetan word equivalents]. Zeitschrift der Deutschen Morgenländischen Gesellschaft 90: 149–159.
 Bouda, Karl. (1957). Die Sprache der Jenissejer. Genealogische und morphologische Untersuchungen [The language of the Yeniseians. Genealogical and morphological investigations]. Anthropos 52.1–2: 65–134.
 Donner, Kai. (1930). Über die Jenissei-Ostiaken und ihre Sprache [About the Yenisei ostyaks and their language]. Journal de la Société Finno-ougrienne 44.
 Van Driem, George. (2001). The Languages of the Himalayas. Leiden: Brill Publishers.
 (Dulson, A.P.) Дульзон, А.П. (1968). Кетский язык [The Ket language]. Томск: Издательство Томского Университета [Tomsk: Tomsk University Press].
 Dybo, Anna V., Starostin, G. S. (2008). In Defense of the Comparative Method, or the End of the Vovin Controversy. // Originally in: Aspects of Comparative Linguistics, v. 3. Moscow: RSUH Publishers, pp. 109–258.
 Georg, Stefan. (2007). A Descriptive Grammar of Ket (Yenisei-Ostyak), Volume I: Introduction, Phonology, Morphology, Folkestone/Kent: Global Oriental. 
 Greenberg, J.H., and M. Ruhlen. (1992). Linguistic Origins of Native Americans. Scientific American 267.5 (November): 94–99.
 Greenberg, J.H., and M. Ruhlen. (1997). L'origine linguistique des Amérindiens[The linguistic origin of the Amerindians]. Pour la Science (Dossier, October), 84–89.
 Kaye, A.S. (1992). Distant genetic relationship and Edward Sapir. Semiotica 91.3/4: 273–300.
 Nikola(y)ev, Sergei L. (1991). Sino-Caucasian Languages in America. In Shevoroshkin (1991): 42–66.
 Pulleyblank, Edwin G. (2002). Central Asia and Non-Chinese Peoples of Ancient China (Collected Studies, 731).
 Reshetnikov, Kirill Yu.; Starostin, George S. (1995). The Structure of the Ket Verbal Form. // Originally in: The Ket Volume (Studia Ketica), v. 4. Moscow: Languages of Russian Culture, pp. 7–121. 
 Starostin, George S. (1995). Morphology of the Kott Verb and Reconstruction of the Proto-Yeniseian Verbal System. // Originally in: The Ket Volume (Studia Ketica), v. 4. Moscow: Languages of Russian Culture, pp. 122–175.
 Ruhlen, M. (1997). Une nouvelle famille de langues: le déné-caucasien [A new language family: Dene–Caucasian]. Pour la Science (Dossier, October) 68–73. 
 Ruhlen, Merritt. (1998a). Dene–Caucasian: A New Linguistic Family. In The Origins and Past of Modern Humans – Towards Reconciliation, ed. by Keiichi Omoto and Phillip V. Tobias, Singapore, World Scientific, 231–46.
 Ruhlen, Merritt. (1998b). The Origin of the Na-Dene. Proceedings of the National Academy of Sciences 95: 13994–96.
 Rubicz, R., Melvin, K.L., Crawford, M.H. 2002. Genetic Evidence for the phylogenetic relationship between Na-Dene and Yeniseian speakers. Human Biology, Dec 1 2002 74 (6) 743–761
 Sapir, Edward. (1920). Comparative Sino-Tibetan and Na-Dené Dictionary. Ms. Ledger. American Philosophical Society Na 20a.3. (Microfilm)
 Shafer, Robert. (1952). Athapaskan and Sino-Tibetan. International Journal of American Linguistics 18: 12–19.
 Shafer, Robert. (1957). Note on Athapaskan and Sino-Tibetan. International Journal of American Linguistics 23: 116–117.
 Stachowski, Marek (1996). Über einige altaische Lehnwörter in den Jenissej-Sprachen. In Studia Etymologica Cracoviensia 1: 91–115.
 Stachowski, Marek (1997). Altaistische Anmerkungen zum “Vergleichenden Wörterbuch der Jenissej-Sprachen”. In Studia Etymologica Cracoviensia 2: 227–239.
 Stachowski, Marek (2004). Anmerkungen zu einem neuen vergleichenden Wörterbuch der Jenissej-Sprachen. In Studia Etymologica Cracoviensia 9: 189–204.
 Stachowski, Marek (2006a). Arabische Lehnwörter in den Jenissej-Sprachen des 18. Jahrhunderts und die Frage der Sprachbünde in Sibirien In Studia Linguistica Universitatis Iagellonicae Cracoviensis 123 (2006): 155–158.
 Stachowski, Marek (2006b). Persian loan words in 18th century Yeniseic and the problem of linguistic areas in Siberia. In A. Krasnowolska / K. Maciuszak / B. Mękarska (ed.): In the Orient where the Gracious Light... [Festschrift for A. Pisowicz], Kraków: 179–184.
 (Starostin, Sergei A.) Старостин, Сергей А. (1982). Праенисейская реконструкция и внешние связи енисейских языков [A Proto-Yeniseian reconstruction and the external relations of the Yeniseian languages]. In: Кетский сборник, ed. Е.А. Алексеенко (E.A. Alekseenko). Leningrad: Nauka, 44–237.
 (Starostin, Sergei A.) Старостин, Сергей А. (1984). Гипотеза о генетических связях сино-тибетских языков с енисейскими и северокавказскими языками [A hypothesis on genetic relations of the Sino-Tibetan languages to the Yeniseian and the North Caucasian languages]. In: Лингвистическая реконструкция и древнейшая история Востока [Linguistic reconstruction and the prehistory of the East], 4: Древнейшая языковая ситуация в восточной Азии [The prehistoric language situation in eastern Asia], ed. И. Ф. Вардуль (I.F. Varduľ) et al. Москва: Институт востоковедения [Moscow: Institute of Oriental Studies of the USSR Academy of Sciences], 19–38. [see Starostin 1991]
 Starostin, Sergei A. (1991). On the Hypothesis of a Genetic Connection Between the Sino-Tibetan Languages and the Yeniseian and North Caucasian Languages. In Shevoroshkin (1991): 12–41. [Translation of Starostin 1984]
 Starostin, Sergei A., and Merritt Ruhlen. (1994). Proto-Yeniseian Reconstructions, with Extra-Yeniseian Comparisons. In M. Ruhlen, On the Origin of Languages: Studies in Linguistic Taxonomy. Stanford: Stanford University Press. pp. 70–92. [Partial translation of Starostin 1982, with additional comparisons by Ruhlen.]
 Tailleur, O.G. (1994). Traits paléo-eurasiens de la morphologie iénisséienne. Études finno-ougriennes 26: 35–56.
 Tailleur, O.G. (1958). Un îlot basco-caucasien en Sibérie: les langues iénisséiennes [A little Basque-Caucasian island in Siberia: the Yeniseian languages]. Orbis 7.2: 415–427.
 Toporov, V.N. (1971). Burushaski and Yeniseian Languages: Some Parallels. Travaux linguistiques de Prague 4: 107–125.
 Vajda, Edward J. (1998). The Kets and Their Language. Mother Tongue IV.
 Vajda, Edward J. (2000). Ket Prosodic Phonology. Munich: Lincom Europa Languages of the World vol. 15.
 Vajda, Edward J. (2002). The Origin of Phonemic Tone in Yeniseic. In CLS 37, 2002. (Parasession on Arctic languages: 305–320).
 Vajda, Edward J. (2004). Ket. Lincom Europa, München.
 Vajda, Edward J. (2004). Languages and Prehistory of Central Siberia. Current Issues in Linguistic Theory 262. John Benjamin Publishing Company. (Presentation of the Yeniseian family and its speakers, together with neighboring languages and their speakers, in linguistic, historical and archeological view)
 Vajda, Edward J. (2007). Yeniseic substrates and typological accommodation in central Siberia.
 Vajda, Edward J. (2008). "Yeniseic" a chapter in the book Language isolates and microfamilies of Asia, Routledge, to be co-authored with Bernard Comrie; 53 pages).
 Vajda, Edward J. (2010). "Siberian Link with Na-Dene Languages." The Dene–Yeniseian Connection, ed. by J. Kari and B. Potter, 33–99. Anthropological Papers of the University of Alaska, new series, vol. 5. Fairbanks: University of Alaska Fairbanks, Department of Anthropology.
 Vovin, Alexander. (2000). 'Did the Xiong-nu speak a Yeniseian language?' Central Asiatic Journal 44.1: 87–104.
 Vovin, Alexander. (2002). 'Did the Xiongnu speak a Yeniseian language? Part 2: Vocabulary', in Altaica Budapestinensia MMII, Proceedings of the 45th Permanent International Altaistic Conference, Budapest, June 23–28, pp. 389–394.
 Werner, Heinrich. (1998). Reconstructing Proto-Yenisseian. Mother Tongue IV.
 Werner, Heinrich. (2004). Zur jenissejisch-indianischen Urverwandtschaft [On the Yeniseian-[American] Indian primordial relationship]. Wiesbaden: Harassowitz.

External links

 Results from the February 2008 Dene–Yeniseic Symposium
 A Siberian Link With Na-Dene Languages by Edward Vajda, a proponent of the Yeniseian-Na-Dene connection.
 Lecture notes on the Ket people  by Edward Vajda.
 Map of the Yeniseian family from the Santa Fe Institute.
 Comparison of Yeniseian and Na-Dene by Merritt Ruhlen.
 Yenisseian Etymology by S. A. Starostin.
 Sino-Caucasian [comparative phonology] by S. A. Starostin. 2005.
 Sino-Caucasian [comparative glossary] by S. A. Starostin. 2005.
 Article on Yeniseian languages 
 Multimedia Database of Ket Language, Moscow State (Lomonosov) University
 Ket language vocabulary with loanwords (from the World Loanword Database)

 
Language families
Dené–Yeniseian languages
Paleosiberian languages